Sudhir Sakharam Naik  (born 21 February 1945) is a former Indian cricketer who played in three Test matches and two One Day Internationals in 1974 in the Indian cricket team. A courageous right-hand opening batsman, Sudhir Naik went as one of the candidates for the opening batsman's slot on the 1974 tour of England. He did well in the first-class matches, scoring 730 runs (40.55) and forced his way into the team for the final Test at Edgbaston. Out for 4 in the first innings, Naik batted in gritty fashion in a losing cause in the second innings to top-score with 77. This was few days after he was caught shop-lifting two pair of socks at M&S on the Oxford Street. He pleaded guilty under pressure from the Indian Government and BCCI.  Back home he played in two more Tests against West Indies. This turned out to be his last season played for India.

For Bombay, however, Naik did very well and in the Ranji Trophy he scored 2687 runs (40.10) with a highest score of 200 not out against Baroda in 1973–74. But perhaps Naik's biggest distinction was that he led Bombay to an unexpected Ranji Trophy triumph in 1970–71. It was a badly depleted side with the stars being away with the Indian team in the West Indies. But Naik making adroit use of the limited resources proved himself to be an astute captain.

He has a much extensive and impressive career in the domestic Indian cricket in varied capacities of cricketer, coach and ground-curator.

He started his career by playing for Bombay University and later went on to captain the Tata Oil Mills team where he was an employee. He is a rare combination of a cricketer and an organic chemist with first class in MSc in Organic Chemistry from Ruparel College in Bombay.

Beside playing for India, he also captained Bombay in the Ranji Trophy for several years. He remains active in the game as the coach at his own National Cricket Club, Mumbai which has produced star cricketers for India like Zaheer Khan and Wasim Jaffer and many like Rajesh Pawar, Raju Sutar and Paras Mhambrey who are past and present players for Mumbai.

Since 2005 he has an added responsibility on his shoulders. He is the Ground In charge at the Wankhede Cricket Stadium taking care of the wicket and the outfield, in preparation for cricket matches. He prepared the much-praised pitch and outfield at the Wankhede Cricket Ground in Mumbai on which the final of the 2011 World Cup was played. India won the World Cup and Naik's efforts were clearly one of the most important factors in the entertaining day's play.

Currently Naik is overlooking the preparation of grounds and pitches of the west zone in the capacity of West Zone In-charge of BCCI's Ground and Pitch Committee.

External links 

Batsman takes fresh guard: An article showcasing his cricketing background and his role as the ground-curator at the Wankhede Stadium, Mumbai.

1945 births
Living people
India Test cricketers
India One Day International cricketers
Indian cricketers
West Zone cricketers
Mumbai cricketers
Indian cricket coaches
Cricketers from Mumbai